Sakiet Sidi Youssef is a town and commune in the Kef Governorate, Tunisia, near the border with Algeria. As of 2014, it had a population of 6,335.

History
In Roman times, the town was known as Naraggara. Roman historian Livy says that the Battle of Zama at the conclusion of the Second Punic War in 202 BCE took place near Naraggara.

On 8 February 1958, it was bombarded by French forces in the belief that it was serving as a refuge for Algerian independence fighters. About 20 French bombers and fighters attacked causing at least 70 deaths and 130 wounded. This event sparked an international outcry and helped precipitate the end of the Algerian War.

See also
List of cities in Tunisia
Bizerte crisis

References

Populated places in Tunisia
Communes of Tunisia
Tunisia geography articles needing translation from French Wikipedia